Ippolito Franconi (1593–1653) was a Roman Catholic prelate who served as Bishop of Nocera de' Pagani (1632–1653).

Biography
Ippolito Franconi was born in Agnone, Italy and ordained a priest on 28 October 1631.
On 19 January 1632, he was appointed during the papacy of Pope Urban VIII as Bishop of Nocera de' Pagani.
On 25 January 1632, he was consecrated bishop by Antonio Marcello Barberini, Cardinal-Priest of Sant'Onofrio, with Antonio Provana, Archbishop of Turin, and Giovanni Francesco Passionei, Bishop of Cagli, serving as co-consecrators. 
He served as Bishop of Nocera de' Pagani until his death in 1653.

While bishop, he was the principal co-consecrator of Roberto Fontana, Bishop of Modena (1645) and Gregorio Coppino, Bishop of Sant'Angelo dei Lombardi e Bisaccia (1645).

References

External links and additional sources
 (for Chronology of Bishops) 
 (for Chronology of Bishops) 

17th-century Italian Roman Catholic bishops
Bishops appointed by Pope Urban VIII
1593 births
1653 deaths